Ratu Epeli Nailatikau I (1842 - 1901) was a Fijian Paramount Chief, who was posthumously made the Vunivalu of Bau.  He was the eldest son of the first Tui Viti, Ratu Seru Epenisa Cakobau and his first wife, Adi Litia Samanunu, daughter of the Roko Tui Bau.

He acted as his father's right-hand man in the Bauan struggles for power, and was subsequently made a governor of many of the Fijian states, (including being made the Roko Tui Tailevu) and a minister in various early portfolios. He was also a signatory to the 1874 Deed of Cession to Great Britain (see Fiji's Cession to Great Britain).

Ratu Epeli's eldest son, Ratu Penaia Kadavulevu inherited the title of Vunivalu, while his second daughter, Adi Moce was the wife of Ratu Alifereti Finau and the grandmother of Fiji's Founding Father, Ratu Sir Kamisese Mara.

References

 S. Berwick, Who's Who in Fiji, Berwick Publishing House, 1990

Fijian chiefs
Vunivalu of Bau
1842 births
1901 deaths
Tui Kaba
People from Bau (island)
19th-century Oceanian people
20th-century Oceanian people